Stigmella divina is a moth of the family Nepticulidae. It is only known from the western part of Kopet Dag mountains in Turkmenistan and the Central Anatolia and the Sivas Province in Turkey.

Adults are on wing from late June to August.

External links
Stigmella Divina sp. n., A Remarkable Species From Turkmenistan And Turkey (Lepidoptera, Nepticulidae)

Nepticulidae
Moths of Asia
Moths described in 1997